The enzyme 5-(3,4-diacetoxybut-1-ynyl)-2,2′-bithiophene deacetylase (EC 3.1.1.66) catalyzes the reaction

5-(3,4-diacetoxybut-1-ynyl)-2,2′-bithiophene + H2O  5-(3-hydroxy-4-acetoxybut-1-ynyl)-2,2′-bithiophene + acetate

This enzyme belongs to the family of hydrolases, specifically those acting on carboxylic ester bonds.  The systematic name is 5-(3,4-diacetoxybut-1-ynyl)-2,2′-bithiophene acetylhydrolase. Other names in common use include diacetoxybutynylbithiophene acetate esterase, and 3,4-diacetoxybutinylbithiophene:4-acetate esterase.

References

 

EC 3.1.1
Enzymes of unknown structure